Graham Thomas Condon  (11 February 1949 – 8 September 2007) was a disabled athlete who won seven medals for New Zealand competing in Paralympic swimming and athletic events and a total of 36 medals in international competition overall. He was also a local-body politician and a disability advocate.

Biography

Condon was rendered a paraplegic after contracting childhood polio.  Condon was the only New Zealander to take part in six consecutive Paralympics. He competed in the Paralympics in athletics and swimming at both the 1968 Tel Aviv and 1972 Heidelberg Games, and won a gold medal in the Men's Discus 3 event at the latter competition. He participated in the 1976 Toronto Paralympics and won a gold medal in the Men's Discus 2 event and a silver medal in the Men's Slalom 2 event at the 1980 Arnhem Games; he also participated in swimming at the 1980 games. At the 1984 New York/Stoke Mandeville Games, he won two bronze medals in the Men's Marathon 2 and Men's Slalom 2 events. During the Marathon, he was with a bloc of competitors from Australia, America, and Canada when he hit a pothole around the  mark, causing the competitor behind him, Robert McIntyre, to lose his balance and flip upside down.  Condon helped McIntyre back into position and ended up coming third. His final Paralympics were the 1988 Seoul Games, where he won a silver medal in the Men's Slalom 2 event. He won a total of seven Paralympic medals and 36 medals in international competitions throughout his career.

He was one of the founding members of Parafed Canterbury, which strives to boost sport and recreational involvement among the disabled. He was also a board member of the national sports agency SPARC for five years. Condon was elected as a Christchurch city councillor in 1995 and served four terms as a city councillor. He was standing for re-election for the Shirley-Papanui ward in the October 2007 election.

Death
On Saturday 8 September 2007 the 58-year-old Condon was killed in an accident involving a car while riding his hand-propelled bicycle. He was struck by a fifteen-year-old driver on Lower Styx Road, Brooklands. The funeral was held at the Cathedral of the Blessed Sacrament where hundreds of mourners paid their respects. He was survived by his wife of 35 years, Kath, and his two children, Craig and Andrea.

Recognition
Condon was awarded the Queen's Service Medal for community service in the 1982 Queen's Birthday Honours, and a New Zealand 1990 Commemoration Medal in 1990.

The Graham Condon Recreation and Sports Centre in Papanui, which opened on 9 October 2011, is named after him. Parafed Canterbury have also named a scholarship after him.

References

External links
 
  (1968, 1972, 1980, 1984, 1988)

Paralympic gold medalists for New Zealand
Paralympic silver medalists for New Zealand
Paralympic bronze medalists for New Zealand
Wheelchair category Paralympic competitors
Paralympic athletes of New Zealand
Paralympic swimmers of New Zealand
Athletes (track and field) at the 1968 Summer Paralympics
Swimmers at the 1968 Summer Paralympics
Athletes (track and field) at the 1972 Summer Paralympics
Swimmers at the 1972 Summer Paralympics
Competitors at the 1976 Summer Paralympics
Athletes (track and field) at the 1980 Summer Paralympics
Swimmers at the 1980 Summer Paralympics
Athletes (track and field) at the 1984 Summer Paralympics
Athletes (track and field) at the 1988 Summer Paralympics
Medalists at the 1972 Summer Paralympics
Medalists at the 1980 Summer Paralympics
Medalists at the 1984 Summer Paralympics
Medalists at the 1988 Summer Paralympics
Paralympic medalists in athletics (track and field)
New Zealand male swimmers
Wheelchair discus throwers
New Zealand wheelchair racers
People with paraplegia
People with polio
Road incident deaths in New Zealand
Recipients of the Queen's Service Medal
New Zealand justices of the peace
Christchurch City Councillors
20th-century New Zealand politicians
1949 births
2007 deaths